Sands is an English and Scottish surname. Notable people with the surname include:

 Benjamin Aymar Sands (1853–1917), American lawyer
Benjamin F. Sands (1811–1883), officer in the United States Navy during the Mexican–American War and the American Civil War
 Bethanie Mattek-Sands (born 1985), American tennis player
 Billy Sands (1911–1984), American character actor
 Bobby Sands (1954–1981), Irish republican who died in the 1981 Irish Hunger Strike
 Bradley Sands (born 1978), American author and editor
 Charlie Sands (baseball) (born 1947), baseball player
 Charlie Sands (ice hockey) (1911–1953), ice hockey player
 Charles Sands (1865–1945), American golfer and tennis player
 Cole Sands (born 1997), American baseball player
 Comfort Sands (1748–1834), American politician
 Dave Sands (1926–1952), Australian aborigine boxer
 Diana Sands (1934–1973), African-American actress
 Diane Sands (born 1947), American politician from Montana
 Donny Sands (born 1996), American baseball player
 Edward F. Sands (1894–19??), suspect in the murder of Hollywood director William Desmond Taylor
 Evie Sands (born 1946), American singer, songwriter and musician
 Ferdinand Sands (1806–1839), American lawyer
 James Sands (born 2000), American soccer player
 James H. Sands (1845–1911), officer in the United States Navy during the American Civil War
 Jerry Sands (born 1987), American baseball player
 Jodie Sands, American singer
 John Sands (1826–1900), Scottish journalist and artist
 John Sands (footballer) (1859–1924), English footballer
 Johnny Sands (1928–2003), American actor
 Joshua Sands (politician) (1757–1835), member of the United States House of Representatives from New York.
 Joshua R. Sands (1795–1883), United States Navy officer
 Julian Sands (born 1958), British actor
 Leevan Sands (born 1981), Bahamian triple jumper and Olympic medallist
 Lynsay Sands, Canadian author of over 30 books
 Marvin Sands (1924–1999), American businessman, founder and CEO of Constellation Brands
 Michael Sands (media) (1945–2012), American model, actor and media consultant
 Mike Sands (athlete) (born 1953), Bahamian sprint athlete and athletics official
 Mike Sands (ice hockey) (born 1963), Canadian ice hockey player
 Percy Sands (1881–1965), English footballer
 Peter Sands (banker) (born 1961), CEO of Standard Chartered Bank
 Peter Sands (politician) (1924–2015), Irish Fianna Fáil politician
 Philippe Sands (born 1960), British professor of international law and author of Lawless World
 Renee Sands (born 1974), American singer and actress
 Richard Sands (businessman) (born 1950/51), American billionaire, chairman of Constellation Brands
 Rob Sands (born 1958/59), American billionaire, CEO of Constellation Brands
 Robert Sands (artist) (born 1943), American artist
 Robert Sands (conductor) (1828–1872), Irish-born conductor of the Mormon Tabernacle Choir in the United States' Utah Territory
 Robert Charles Sands (1799–1832), American writer
 Roger Sands (born 1942), British public servant
 Roland Sands (born 1974), American motorcycle racer
 Sarah Sands (born 1961), British journalist and author
 Shamar Sands (born 1985), Bahamian hurdler
 Stafford Sands (1913–1972), finance minister of the Bahamas, helped create the Bahamas' tourism industry
 Tara Sands (born 1975), American voice actress
 Terdell Sands (born 1979), American football player
 Tom Sands (born 1954), American politician from Iowa
 Tommy Sands (American singer) (born 1937), American singer and actor
 Tommy Sands (Irish singer) (born 1945), Northern Irish folk singer, songwriter, radio broadcaster, and political activist
 Walter B. Sands (1870–1938), chief justice of the Montana Supreme Court

Fictional characters:
George Sands, a lead character in the British television series Being Human
Sheldon Sands, a CIA agent (portrayed by Johnny Depp) from the 2003 movie Once Upon a Time in Mexico
Max Sands, a racist biker in the HBO drama Oz

See also
Sand (surname)
Sandys (surname)
Michael Sands (disambiguation)

English-language surnames
Scottish surnames